Gertrude "Getty" Kaspers (born 5 March 1948) is an Austrian-born Dutch singer. She was the lead vocalist of the Dutch band Teach-In, with which she won the Eurovision Song Contest 1975 with the song "Ding-a-dong".

Career

Early career 
Kaspers joined the band Teach-In in 1971. In 1974, the band had three Top 15 hits in the Netherlands. The band also had a number of international successes. One of these, "In The Summernight", reached number 5 in South Africa for 13 weeks and also peaked at number 3 in the Dutch and Belgian charts for 10 and 9 weeks respectively.

Eurovision Song Contest
Teach-In participated in the Nationaal Songfestival 1975, the Dutch national final for the Eurovision Song Contest 1975. The competition was held in the Jaarbeurs convention centre in Utrecht, and for the first time since 1970, the act had not been preselected by broadcaster NOS, but was selected in a two-stage process. Teach-In were required to perform their song "Ding-a-dong" in the first round to select the song that would represent the Netherlands. A five-member international jury selected the winning song 4 votes to 1 over the songs "Ik heb geen geld voor de trein" from Albert West and "Circus" from Debbie (Dutch versions of Teach-In songs "Tennessee Town" and "The Circus Show").

With the song "Ding-a-dong" winning the first round, all three performers were required to sing this song in the second round to decide the winning artist. The final vote would consist of a public vote resulting in Teach-In winning the Nationaal Songfestival with 56 points, compared to 33 points for Albert West and 11 points for Debbie.

As the lead vocalist of Teach-In, Kaspers opened the Eurovision Song Contest 1975 held in Stockholm, Sweden, and went on to win the contest with 152 points.

After their Eurovision victory, the band entered the charts in nearly every European country. "Ding-a-dong" reached third place in the Top 40 of the National Hit Parade in the Netherlands and reached place thirteen in the British charts. Later that year, Teach-In released the single "Goodbye Love", which also made the Top 10, peaking at number 5 for 7 weeks.

In 1976, Kaspers returned to the Eurovision Song Contest to give Brotherhood of Man, the winners of the Eurovision Song Contest 1976, their prizes.

Solo career
Teach-In toured Europe for the next two years, but the disappointing sale of the album "Get On Board" and the song "Rose Valley" caused the band to break apart in 1978. Whilst Ruud Nijhuis and Koos Versteeg decided to reform the band in 1979 with two new female singers, Kaspers decided to continue her music career as a solo artist under the stage name Getty, recording a couple of discs including the Getty Album, featuring such songs as "Mademoiselle", "Love Me" and "De Eerste Liefde is Een Feest", originally "The Queen of Hearts" by Agnetha Fältskog in Swedish and English. Her vocals can also be heard on Rick van der Linden's "Cum Laude" album and on recordings made by Radio Veronica.

In 1978, she joined her bandmate John Gaasbeek with Wilma van Diepen and formed the Balloon trio, recording a few songs such as "All You Need Is The Music" and "Summerparty", featuring cameos of well known songs. After little success, the trio broke apart in 1980.

Later appearances and Teach-In revival 
Kaspers was present as a jury member in the 1978, 1982 and 2009 Dutch national final for the Eurovision Song Contest. She also featured in the 2005 Eurovision documentary "Tour d'Eurovision", highlighting some of the best performances of Eurovision.

In 1997, it was announced that the original line-up of Teach-In, including Kaspers, had re-recorded some of their old hits and had plans to tour again. The band reunited to sing "Ding-a-dong" at a show in Maastricht on 31 August 2007. Kaspers also performed with the group in the original line-up at the opening of the 2009 Eurovision Song Contest in Moscow, singing classics such as "Ding-a-dong" and "I'm Alone".

In 2009, Teach-In re-released a combined album titled "Festival/Get On Board". The following year, the band released the "Best Of Teach-In" album, featuring their greatest hits.

Kaspers was present at the 2012 Dutch national final for the Eurovision Song Contest.

Personal life
Kaspers was born in Graz, Austria on 5 March 1948. to a Dutch mother and an Austrian father. She is fluent in English, Dutch and German. In 2011, Kaspers' husband died of ALS.

In April 2019, Luitingh-Sijthoff published a book about the illustrious life of Kaspers. In "Een leven lang geleden" Kaspers tells that her life has not always been a fairy tale. Her youth was dominated by the aftermath of the World War II, and also life after "Dinge-dong" went with many ups and downs. Kasper's biography was written by Dave Boomkens, a Dutch writer who is known from books such as "Liesbeth List, de dochter van de vuurtorenwachter" and "Het Grote Songfestivalboek".

Discography

Singles

Albums

See also
Teach-In
Netherlands in the Eurovision Song Contest

References

External links 
 
 
 

1948 births
Living people
Dutch women singers
Dutch pop singers
Eurovision Song Contest winners
People from Weiz District
Dutch people of Austrian descent